Tappeh Ali (also Romanized as Tappeh ‘Alī and Tappeh-ye ‘Alī) is a village in Solgi Rural District, Khezel District, Nahavand County, Hamadan Province, Iran. At the 2006 census, its population was 145, in 32 families.

References 

Populated places in Nahavand County